The 2022 UCI Road World Championships was the 95th edition of the UCI Road World Championships, the annual world championships for road bicycle racing. It was held between 18 and 25 September 2022 in Wollongong, New South Wales, Australia.

In February 2022, the UCI announced that a women's U23 category would be added to the road race and time trial events. The titles would be awarded from within the elite women's events, and separate races would be added from 2025.

On 1 March 2022, AusCycling announced that Russian and Belarusian teams would not be allowed to compete based on the International Olympic Committee's recommendation regarding the Russian invasion of Ukraine.

Routes
In March 2022, the routes for the championships were announced. 

The Elite Road races started in Helensburgh, about 30km north of Wollongong before a 34km loop around Mount Keira (climb length of 8.7km, average gradient of 5%, maximum incline of 15%). The Elite Road races then take in laps of the Wollongong City Circuit. This 17.7km circuit had 220m of climbing elevation each lap including the Mount Pleasant climb (climb length of 1.1 km, average gradient of 7.7%, maximum incline of 14%). 

In total, the Elite Women Road Race climbed 2433m elevation over a race distance of 164.3km (1 Mount Keira loop, 6x Wollongong City Circuit) and the Elite Men Road Race climbed 3945m over a race distance of 266.9km (1 Mount Keira loop, 12x Wollongong City Circuit). The other road races (Junior men, Junior women, U23 men) used laps of the Wollongong City Circuit for their events.

The time trial events used courses similar to the Wollongong City Circuit, albeit avoiding the Mount Pleasant climb. The Elite Women and Elite Men time trial events were over the same distance (34.2km).

Schedule
All times listed below are for the local time – Australian Eastern Standard Time or UTC+10:00.

Medal summary

Elite events

Under-23 events

Junior events

Medal table

Notes

References

External links

 
UCI Road World Championships by year
World Championships
2022 in Australian sport
Sport in Wollongong
International cycle races hosted by Australia
UCI